Rhipsideigma is a genus of beetles in the family Cupedidae. It contains five species, four of which ( R. lugubris (Fairmaire, 1895), R. raffrayi (Fairmaire, 1884), R. adjuncta Neboiss, 1984 and R. anosibense Neboiss, 1989) are endemic to Madagascar, the other (R. cretaceotincta (Kolbe, 1897)) being endemic to the northern coast of Tanzania. They vary in length from 13 mm to 20 mm, and are up to 6 mm wide.

References 

Archostemata genera
Cupedidae